Pristimantis unistrigatus, common name: striped robber frog, is a species of frog in the family Strabomantidae. It is found in the Andean valleys from southern Colombia to central Ecuador.

Description
Adult males measure  and adult females  in snout–vent length. The head is wider than the body in females but equal or narrower in males. The snout is rounded in lateral view and subacuminate to subovoid in dorsal view. The tympanum is visible but not distinct and partly obscured by the supratympanic fold. The finger and toe tips bear discs. Coloration is variable. The most common morph is pale brown above with an indefinite darker interorbital triangle and a series of brown spots forming dorsal chevrons. Another morph is similar to the first one but has a narrow, cream vertebral stripe running through the body. The third form is striped with several tan, medium-brown, and dark brown stripes on the back. Males have an external subgular vocal sac.

The male advertisement call is a hollow click.

Distribution
Pristimantis unistrigatus is found in the Colombian Massif in southern Colombia (Putumayo and Nariño Departments), and in the inter-Andean valleys of Ecuador all way south to the Chimborazo Province.

Habitat and conservation
During the day these frogs hide under objects on the ground, occasionally also in arboreal bromeliads. At night they are active on vegetation and on the ground.

The only threat to this species is heavy agrochemical pollution. Its range overlaps with several protected areas.

References

unistrigatus
Amphibians of the Andes
Amphibians of Colombia
Amphibians of Ecuador
Amphibians described in 1859
Taxa named by Albert Günther
Taxonomy articles created by Polbot